The 2017 Dollar General Bowl was a college football bowl game played on December 23, 2017, at Ladd–Peebles Stadium in Mobile, Alabama, United States.  The 19th edition of the Dollar General Bowl featured the Sun Belt Conference co-champion Appalachian State Mountaineers against the Mid-American Conference champion Toledo Rockets.  Kickoff was scheduled for 6:00 PM CST and the game aired on ESPN.  It was one of the 2017–18 bowl games concluding the 2017 FBS football season.  The game was sponsored by the Dollar General chain of variety stores.

Teams
The game featured the Appalachian State Mountaineers against the Toledo Rockets.  It was the second all-time meeting between the schools; the first was the 2016 Camellia Bowl which saw the Mountaineers defeat the Rockets by a score of 31–28.

Appalachian State Mountaineers

This was the Mountaineers' first Dollar General Bowl.

Toledo Rockets

This was the Rockets' third Dollar General Bowl; their record in prior games was 2–0, having previously defeated the UTEP Miners 45–13 in the 2005 game (when it was known as the GMAC Bowl) and having subsequently defeated the Arkansas State Red Wolves 63–44 in the January 2015 game (when it was known as the GoDaddy Bowl).

Game summary

Scoring summary

Statistics

References

External links
 ESPN summary

2017–18 NCAA football bowl games
LendingTree Bowl
Appalachian State Mountaineers football bowl games
Toledo Rockets football bowl games
2017 in sports in Alabama
December 2017 sports events in the United States